Wajid is a town in the southern Bakool region of Somalia. It is the center of the Wajid District.

Overview

In March 2014, Somali Armed Forces assisted by an Ethiopian battalion with AMISOM captured the district from Al-Shabaab. The offensive was part of an intensified military operation by the allied forces to remove the insurgent group from the remaining areas in southern Somalia under its control.

According to Prime Minister Abdiweli Sheikh Ahmed, the government subsequently launched stabilization efforts in the newly liberated areas, which also included Hudur, Rabdhure and Burdhubo. The Ministry of Defence was providing ongoing reassurance and security to the local residents, and supplying logistical and security support to deliver relief assistance. Additionally, the Ministry of Interior was prepared to support and put into place programs to assist local administration and security. A Deputy Minister and several religious scholars were also dispatched to all four towns to coordinate and supervise the federal government's stabilization initiatives.

Demographics
As of 2000, Wajid had a population of around 8,100 inhabitants. The broader Wajid District has a total population of 69,694 residents.

Notes

References
Wajid, Somalia

External links
Administrative map of Bakool Region

Populated places in Bakool